Bouvier is a white wine grape and table grape planted primarily in Central Europe—most notably in Austria, Hungary, Slovakia and Slovenia, where it is also known as Ranina.

Bouvier ripens very early, is resistant to frost, and gives a rather low yield. Its wines are golden yellow, mild in taste and have a Muscat aroma.

History and pedigree
Winery owner Clotar Bouvier (1853–1930) discovered a vine of this variety in his vineyard in Herzogburg, Ober-Radkersburg (in present-day Slovenia) in the year 1900. He used this vine as a basis for breeding and, after several years of selection, started to sell it, after which it became widely spread across Austria-Hungary. DNA profiling has revealed Bouvier to be a crossing (probably a natural one) of a Pinot variety (which could be Pinot noir, Pinot gris or Pinot blanc) and another, unidentified variety, possibly Muscat à Petits Grains according to the Vitis International Variety Catalogue.

In 1963 at the Kölyuktetö viticultural research facility in Eger, viticulturists László Bereznai and József Csizmazia crossed Bouvier with Eger 2 (a selfling of Villard blanc) to produce the Hungarian wine grape Bianca.

Synonyms 
Bouvier is also known under the synonyms Bela Ranina, Bela Ranka, Boouvierovo Grozno, Bouvier blanc, Bouvier Précoce, Bouvier Trante weisse, Bouvier Traube weisse, Bouvierov Hrozen, Bouvierova Ranina, Bouvierovo Grozno, Bouvierovo Hrozno, Bouvierovo Ranina, Bouvierrebe, Bouviertraube, Bouviertraube weisse, Bouvieruv Hrozen, Bouvijejeva Ranka, Bouvijeorva Ranina, Bouvijerova Ranka, Bovije, Buveleova Ranka, Buvie, Buvierov Hrozen, Buvije, Buvijeova Ranina, Buvijeova Ranka, Buvijeva Ranka, Buvileova Ranka, Chasselas Bouvier, Findling, Kimmig Kp 1, Précoce de Bouvier, Précoce de Bouvier bianco, Précoce de Bouvier blanc, Précoce di Bouvier bianco, Radgonska Ranina, Radgonska Ranina bijela, Ragdonska Ranina bela, Ranina, Ranina bela, Ranka, and Sasla Buvije.

References 

White wine grape varieties
Table grape varieties
Hungarian wine
Austrian wine
Slovak wine
Slovenian wine